Gattyana mossambica is a scale worm described from the Indian Ocean off Mozambique.

Description
Gattyana mossambica is a short-bodied worm with 45 segments and 15 pairs of elytra, which bear a marginal fringe of papillae. The lateral antennae are positioned ventrally on the prostomium, directly beneath the median antenna. A pair of anterior projections are present on the anterior margin of the prostomium also. Notochaetae are thinner than the  neurochaetae, and the neurochaetae bear bidentate tips, which contradicts the diagnosis of the genus.

Biology and Ecology
Gattyana mossambica has been collected from the tubes of Eunice tubifex but it is not clear if this represents a commensal relationship.

References

Phyllodocida